Mata Maxime Esuite Mbanda  (born 10 April 1993) is an Italian international rugby union player.
His usual position is as a flanker, and he currently plays for Colorno. Known for his ball carrying and athleticism.

Early career
For 2015–16 Pro12 season, he named as Permit Player for Zebre in Pro 14.

In 2013 Mbanda was named in the Italy Under 20 squad and in 2014 and 2015 he was also named to the Emerging Italy squad.

Professional career
In 2016, from Calvisano, he signed for Zebre in Pro 14. He played for Italian team until 2021–22 United Rugby Championship season.
After a string of favourable performances, the No. 8, was selected to represent,  the Italian national team in a test-match in San Jose, California, during Summer International tests against the United States. Italy won with a result of 24 to 20. Since then Mbanda has been a regular in the Italian national side, featuring in the 2019 Rugby World Cup, in Japan.

Personal life
During the COVID-19 pandemic in Italy, Mbanda volunteered for the Yellow Cross, a humanitarian organization in Parma that transports food and medicine for the elderly. On 3 June 2020 the President of Italy Sergio Mattarella named Mbanda a Knight of the Order of Merit of the Italian Republic for his services as a volunteer ambulance driver.

References

External links
Zebre Profile
Pro12 Profile
It's Rugby England Profile

1993 births
Living people
Italian rugby union players
Italy international rugby union players
Rugby union flankers
Rugby Calvisano players
Zebre Parma players
Sportspeople from Rome
Italian people of Democratic Republic of the Congo descent
Italian sportspeople of African descent
Recipients of the Order of Merit of the Italian Republic